Lizzie Bright and the Buckminster Boy is a young adult historical novel by Gary D. Schmidt, published by Clarion Books in 2004. The book received the Newbery Honor in 2005 and was selected as a Michael L. Printz Honor that same year.

The book was based on a real event. In 1912, the government of Maine put the residents of Malaga Island in a mental hospital and tore up their homes.

Plot summary
This book is set in 1912. Turner Buckminster, a minister's son, has just moved from Boston, Massachusetts to Phippsburg, Maine and is constantly being scolded for simple misunderstandings, not to mention being automatically disliked by the boys of Phippsburg for being bad at baseball. Turner meets a black girl,  Lizzie Bright Griffin, who becomes friends with him, despite his difficulty with social situations. Turner has to save Lizzie's family and friends before they all must leave, or worse, get put into an insane asylum in New Gloucester, Maine. But that means standing up to the authorities, including Turner's father.

References

2004 American novels
 Newbery Honor-winning works
Fiction set in 1912
 American young adult novels 
 Children's historical novels
 American historical novels
 Novels set in Maine
 Novels set in the 1910s
2004 children's books
Clarion Books books